Buzz is one of the albums from Christian rock band Guardian. The album was released in October 1995 and was produced by Steve Taylor. The album takes the band into the realms of alternative music and grunge common of the 90s.

Guardian opened for Taylor in a tour which prompted them to ask him to produce their next album. Taylor was hesitant to do so at first, but then agreed as he became friends of the band.

Track listing
 "This Old Man" (Palacios, Rowe, Taylor) – 2:29
 "Lead the Way" (Rowe, Taylor) – 2:43
 "State of Mine" (Bach, Rowe) – 3:04
 "The Lion's Den" (Palacios, Rowe, Taylor) – 3:54
 "Are You Gonna Keep Your Word?" (Rowe, Taylor) – 3:34
 "One Thing Left to Do" (Bach, Ney, Palacios, Rowe, Taylor) – 3:36
 "Hand of the Father" (Bach, Palacios, Rowe) – 4:27
 "Psychedelic Runaway" (Palacios) – 3:26
 "Even It Out" (Bach, Palacios) – 3:55
 "Lift Me Up" (Rowe) – 2:57
 "Shorty" (Bach, Palacios) – 2:23
 "Lullaby" (Bach) – 2:56
 "Them Nails" (Bach, Palacios, Rowe) – 2:26

Album artwork 
The album slip featured four interchangeable covers. All of them references to the title Buzz. The four covers were:
 A picture of astronaut Buzz Aldrin.
 A close-up of a bee hive.
 A picture of two girls whispering between them (as in "buzzing").
 A picture of a mother giving a buzz cut haircut to her young son. Note: This picture is actually David Bach's mom giving his older brother a haircut.

Personnel 
Guardian
 Jamie Rowe – lead vocals, guitar on "Them Nails"
 Tony Palacios – guitars, backing vocals
 David Bach – bass, backing vocals
 Karl Ney – drums

Guest musicians
 Eric Darken – percussion
 John Mark Painter – string arrangements
 The Love Sponge String Quartet
 John Catchings – cello
 Kristin Wilkinson – viola
 David Davidson – violin
 Pamela Sixfin – violin

Production 
 Steve Taylor – producer
 Mark Maxwell – A&R direction
 Russ Long – engineer
 David Schober – additional engineer
 Rich Hanson – recording assistant 
 Dave Latto – recording assistant 
 Paul Skaife – recording assistant 
 Rick Will – mixing
 F. Reid Shippen – mix assistant
 Bob Ludwig – mastering
 David Bach – art direction, design 
 Jamie Rowe – design
 Stephen L. Buchmann – photography (bees)
 Black Box Studios – photography (whispering twins)
 NASA – photography (Buzz Aldrin)
 Commander H.E. Biedebach – photography (the haircut)

Studios
 Recorded at Quad Studios and The Carport (Nashville, Tennessee).
 Mixed at The Saltmine (Nashville, Tennessee).
 Mastered at Gateway Mastering (Portland, Maine).

External links
Album information

Guardian (band) albums
1995 albums